Dashing in December is an American romantic holiday drama film directed by Jake Helgren. The film stars Peter Porte, Juan Pablo Di Pace, Andie MacDowell, Caroline Harris, Carlos Sanz, and Katherine Bailess.

Premise 
Wyatt Burwall (Porte) finally returns home for the holidays in an effort to convince his mother Deb (McDowell) to sell the family's Colorado ranch.  A romance unexpectedly ignites between Wyatt and the dashing new ranch hand Heath Ramos (Di Pace), who dreams of saving the beloved property and the ranch's magical Winter Wonderland attraction while reawakening the spirit of Christmas in Wyatt's lonely heart.

Cast 

 Peter Porte as Wyatt Burwall
 Juan Pablo Di Pace as Heath Ramos
 Andie MacDowell as Deb Burwall
 Caroline Harris as Blake Berry
 Carlos Sanz as Carlos
 Katherine Bailess as Willa

Production 
Despite the story taking place in the state of Colorado, the movie was filmed in Utah, in different cities including Salt Lake City, Midway and Heber City. Most of the material was shot in September 2020, and the filming wrapped on October 1.

Release 
The film was released on December 13, 2020 by Paramount Network with simulcasts on Pop TV, Logo TV, and TV Land.

Accolades 
Dashing in December was nominated for the 2021 GLAAD Media Award for Outstanding TV Movie.

See also
 List of Christmas films

References

External links 

2020 films
2020 romantic drama films
American Christmas films
American LGBT-related television films
2020s English-language films
Gay-related films
2020s Christmas films
2020 LGBT-related films
2020s American films